Bagh Dar (also Romanized as Bāgh Dar) is a village in Kushk Rural District, in the Central District of Bafq County, Yazd Province, Iran. At the 2006 census, its population was 61, in 21 families.

References 

Populated places in Bafq County